Kohneh Dan (also Romanized as Kohneh Dān; also known as Kohneh Dūn) is a village in Harazpey-ye Jonubi Rural District, in the Central District of Amol County, Mazandaran Province, Iran. At the 2006 census, its population was 560, in 150 families.

References 

Populated places in Amol County